J.L. King is a New York Times best selling author, publisher, and HIV/STD activist. Subjects of his work include the nature of human behavior, effects of health issues on minorities, and sexual orientation and its impact on schools.  King's first book, On the Down Low: A Journey Into the Lives of Straight Black Men Who Sleep with Men appeared on The New York Times best seller list for more than 30 consecutive weeks.

King is the owner of Urban Moon Publishing, a comprehensive self publishing company founded in 2001 that focuses on increasing the influence of minority writers.

King has appeared in several national and international publications, including Newsweek, Time Magazine, The Washington Post, and The Chicago Tribune.  He has appeared as a special guest on many television shows, including The Oprah Winfrey Show, Inside Edition and CNN.

King has been listed in Ebony Magazine's 50 most Intriguing Blacks and honored as an NAACP Image Award Nominee for Outstanding Literary Work.

In 2006, King produced "The DL Exposed", an award winning documentary that was broadcast on Black Entertainment Television (BET).  The documentary was the number one watched program on BET that year.

Bibliography

Books
 Love on a Two-Way Street
 Sexual Orientation and its Impact on Schools:  A Guide for Middle and Secondary Educators
 CP Time
 Dear JL…Real Stories from Real People
 Staying Power
 Coming Up from the Down Low:  The Journey to Acceptance Healing and Honest Love
 On the Down Low: A Journey into the Lives of "Straight" Black Men Who Sleep With Men

DVD Releases
 Top 10 Signs of Down Low Behavior and More…
 How to Become a Successful and Selling Author
 No More Secrets, No More Lies…Saving Our Daughters

References

External links

American male writers
Living people
Year of birth missing (living people)
American LGBT writers